Ulf Eriksson may refer to:

 Ulf Eriksson (referee) (born 1942), Swedish referee
 Ulf Eriksson (footballer) (born 1958), Swedish international footballer
 Ulf Eriksson (author) (born 1958), Swedish writer and literary critic
 Ulf Eriksson (tennis), Swedish tennis player

See also
 Eriksson